The Battle of the Sit River was fought in the northern part of the present-day Sonkovsky District of Tver Oblast of Russia, close to the selo of Bozhonka, on March 4, 1238 between the Mongol Hordes of Batu Khan and the Rus' under Grand Prince Yuri II of Vladimir-Suzdal during the Mongol invasion of Rus.

Battle 
After the Mongols sacked his capital of Vladimir, Yuri fled across the Volga northward, to Yaroslavl, where he hastily mustered an army.  He and his brothers then turned back toward Vladimir in hopes of relieving the city before the Mongols took it, but they were too late.  Yuri sent out a force of 3,000 men under Dorozh to scout out where the Mongols were; whereupon Dorozh returned saying that Yuri and his force was already surrounded.  As he tried to muster his forces, he was attacked by the Mongol force under Burundai and fled but was overtaken on the Sit River and died there along with his nephew, Prince Vsevolod of Yaroslavl.

Aftermath 
The battle marked the end of unified resistance to the Mongols and inaugurated two centuries of the Mongol domination of Russia and modern day-Ukraine.

References

Sit
Sit
1238 in Europe
the Sit River
13th century in Russia
Sit River